The Turbomeca Gabizo was a small turbojet engine produced by Turbomeca from the 1950s. The components were designed to take the stresses of high-speed fighter aircraft with some variants featuring afterburner.

Applications
 Breguet 1100
 Dassault Étendard II
 Fouga CM.171 Makalu
 SNCASO Trident

Specifications (Gabizo)

See also

References

Further reading

 

1950s turbojet engines
Gabizo
Centrifugal-flow turbojet engines